Aquarium Drunkard is an online music magazine launched in 2005 by Justin Gage, and based in Los Angeles, California. The name "Aquarium Drunkard" is a play on a lyric by the band Wilco. The website was originally created by Gage to share music with friends, but by 2006 the site was being read by a worldwide audience. In 2009, in an essay for The Observer'''s Music Monthly supplement, Nick Hornby, author of High Fidelity, listed Aquarium Drunkard among his six favorite music blogs. According to Rolling Stone, a post on Aquarium Drunkard of a demo by Alabama Shakes helped the band get their first record deal.

The success of Aquarium Drunkard led founder Justin Gage to music supervision, promoting specialty concerts, launching a record label (Autumn Tone Records), and hosting the weekly Aquarium Drunkard Show on Sirius XM Satellite Radio, beginning in 2007. In 2011, Aquarium Drunkard launched the "Lagniappe Sessions", a regular recording series providing a platform for artists to pay tribute to their inspirations, via a selection of covers. In 2016, the vinyl release, Lagniappe Sessions, Vol I, was released via Light In The Attic Records.

The Aquarium Drunkard podcast, Transmissions, juxtaposes in-depth interviews (music, film, literature, visual arts) and discussion with experiments in sound collage.

Esoteric, the Aquarium Drunkard website, publishes an eclectic array of music essays, podcasts, reviews, mixtapes and artist interviews written by Gage along with a handful of contributing writers. The types of music covered include avant jazz, world music, ambient music, post punk, indie rock, vintage garage rock, psychedelic music, folk music, funk music, rhythm and blues, seminal electronic music, primitive blues music and obscure soul music.

In 2014, The Daily Beast included Aquarium Drunkard on a list of "The Best Music Blogs," and Refinery29 has included Aquarium Drunkard on its list of "19 Best Music Blogs That Aren't Pitchfork."

In 2020, Aquarium Drunkard launched Radio Free, a free, 24/7 curated stream of the blog's favorite finds.

The debut episode of the Aquarium Drunkard Picture Show'', a video program of musical performances, animation and found footage, aired on the Adult Swim simulcast on April 25, 2020.

Past guest contributors include: Will Oldham, Dungen, Jim James, Robyn Hitchcock, Sinkane, Jeff Tweedy, Khruangbin, Lower Dens, Steve Gunn, Mountain Goats, Hiss Golden Messenger, Spooner Oldham, Father John Misty, Richard Swift, Iceage, Jon Spencer, Psychic Temple, Mary Lattimore, Kevin Morby, William Tyler, The Dream Syndicate, Wooden Wand, Steve Earle, Mark Kozelek, Of Montreal, The Allah-Las, Dean Wareham, Vetiver, Ryley Walker and many more.

Past interviews include: Charlotte Gainsbourg, Hailu Mergia, Lee "Scratch" Perry, Kris Kristofferson, Yoko Ono, David Berman, Merle Haggard, John Lurie, Daniel Lanois, Kikagaku Moyo, Richard Thompson, David Crosby, Adrian Sherwood, Bonnie 'Prince' Billy, Craig Leon, Destroyer, Cate Le Bon, Stephen Malkmus, Lambchop, Wire, Michael Rother, Jeff Tweedy, Loudon Wainwright, Kurt Vile, Phosphorescent, Gillian Welch, Unknown Mortal Orchestra, Marc Ribot, Ween, Amen Dunes, Tim Heidecker, Television, and many more.

Awards
2009, LA Weekly's Los Angeles Web Awards, Winner: LA's Best Music Blog

2011, MTV O Music Awards, Winner: Best Independent Music Blog

References

Online music magazines published in the United States